Minnesota State Highway 251 (MN 251) is a  highway in southeast Minnesota, which runs from its interchange with Interstate 35 at Clarks Grove and continues east to its eastern terminus at its intersection with U.S. Highway 218 in Lansing Township, north of Austin.

Route description
Highway 251 serves as an east–west route in southeast Minnesota between Clarks Grove, Hollandale, Corning, and Lansing Township near Austin.

Highway 251 is also known as Park Avenue in Hollandale.

At its western terminus interchange with I-35, Highway 251 becomes Freeborn County Road 31, also known as Main Street in Clarks Grove.

History
Highway 251 was authorized on July 1, 1949.

The route was paved between Clarks Grove and Maple Island and between Corning and U.S. 218 at the time it was marked. Originally, the highway turned south at the county line and followed present-day County Road 2 east to U.S. 218. The highway was moved to its current alignment in 1952. This new routing, as well as the remaining gravel portion of the roadway, was paved in 1954 or 1955.

Highway 251 originally extended into Clarks Grove proper to intersect U.S. 65 (present-day County Road 45) until Interstate 35 was built.

Major intersections

References

External links

Highway 251 at the Unofficial Minnesota Highways Page

251
Transportation in Freeborn County, Minnesota
Transportation in Mower County, Minnesota